The 1972 Australian Manufacturers' Championship was a CAMS sanctioned national motor racing title for car manufacturers. It was contested over a five-round series.

All rounds were open only to Group E Series Production Touring Cars.
Entries were divided into four classes, split via "CP Units", where the engine capacity of the vehicle (in litres) was multiplied by the retail price of the vehicle (in dollars) to give a CP (Capacity Price) Units value for each model.
Class A : Up to 3,000 CP Units
Class B : 3,001 to 9,000 CP Units
Class C : 9,001 to 18,000 CP Units
Class D: 18,001 CP Units and over
For each round other than Bathurst, championship points were awarded 9,8,7,6,5,4,3,2,1 in each class
with bonus points awarded for outright placings on a 4,3,2,1 basis.
For the Bathurst round, points were awarded 18,16,14,12,10,8,6,4,2 in each class
with bonus points awarded for outright placings on a 4,3,2,1 basis.

Championship results were as follows.

References

Australian Motor Racing Annual, 1973
Australia's Greatest Motor Race, © 1981
Australia's Greatest Motor Race, 1960–1989, © 1990 
CAMS Manual of Motor Sport, 1972
Modern Motor, November 1972
Official Programme, Adelaide International Raceway, 27 August 1972
Official Programme, Mount Panorama, Bathurst, Sunday 1 October 1972
Racing Car News, September 1972
Racing Car News, October 1972
Racing Car News, November 1972
Racing Car News, December 1972
Racing Car News, January 1973 
The Australian Racing History of Ford, © 1989
The Official Racing History of Holden, © 1988
www.camsmanual.com.au
www.toranagtrxu-1.com

Australian Manufacturers' Championship
Manufacturers' Championship